Mudgett, an English-language family name and place name in America, may refer to:

 Mudgett Township, Minnesota
 Herman Webster Mudgett, a.k.a. H. H. Holmes, 19th-century American serial killer
 The Mudgetts, a Wisconsin punk rock band
 Mudgett, a 1976 piece by Warren Casey